Steven Moya (born August 9, 1991) is a Puerto Rico born-Dominican Republic professional baseball player for the Gastonia Honey Hunters of the Atlantic League of Professional Baseball. He previously played in Major League Baseball (MLB) for the Detroit Tigers and in Nippon Professional Baseball (NPB) for the Chunichi Dragons and Orix Buffaloes.

Career

Detroit Tigers
Moya signed with the Detroit Tigers as a non-drafted free agent in 2008. He made his professional debut with the Dominican Summer League Tigers, batting .252/.361/.372 with 6 home runs and 33 RBI in 60 games. The next year, he played for the GCL Tigers, slashing .190/.229/.299 in 40 games. In 2011, Moya played for the Single-A West Michigan Whitecaps, hitting .204/.234/.362 with career-highs in home runs (13) and RBI (39).

In 2012, Moya had Tommy John surgery, which caused him to play in only 59 games for West Michigan that year. He spent the 2013 season with the High-A Lakeland Flying Tigers, posting a .255/.296/.433 slash line with 12 home runs and 55 RBI. Moya was added to the teams 40-man roster on November 20, 2013.

Moya started the 2014 season with the Double-A Erie SeaWolves. On June 24, it was announced Moya had been named to the All-Star Futures Game. Moya was named the Eastern League All-Star Game MVP after he hit a grand slam in the fifth inning.

On August 28, 2014, Moya was named the 2014 Eastern League Most Valuable Player. Moya finished the season batting .273 (142-for-515) with 33 doubles, three triples, 35 home runs, 105 RBI, 81 runs scored, 16 stolen bases, a .555 slugging percentage and a .306 on-base percentage in 133 games this season. Moya is the first SeaWolves player to be named the league's MVP since the SeaWolves entered the Eastern League in 1999. Moya set a new single-season franchise record for total bases (286), extra-base hits (71), home runs (35) and RBI (105). Moya was named the Detroit Tigers' minor league player of the year.

Moya batted .265 (39-for-147) from August 1 on with 12 doubles, five home runs and 19 RBIs. He finished the season with the Mud Hens batting .240 (120-for-500) with 30 doubles, 20 home runs, 74 RBIs, 27 walks and 162 strikeouts.

Moya made his major league debut on September 1, 2014 as a pinch hitter in the 9th inning, where he recorded a single in his first career at-bat off Austin Adams of the Cleveland Indians. Following the 2014 season, Moya went on to play for the Glendale Desert Dogs of the Arizona Fall League. In 23 games, he batted .289 with six doubles, one triple, five home runs, and 19 RBI. Moya was also named to the Arizona Fall League Rising Stars Game.

He was called up by the Tigers on September 8, 2015 as a September call-up. He was 4-for-25 in nine September games.

On March 26, 2016, he was optioned to the Triple-A Toledo Mud Hens.
On May 12, 2016 he was recalled from Triple A. He was optioned back to Toledo later, but was recalled again on June 16, 2016, upon an injury to the Tigers starting right fielder, J. D. Martinez. Moya was optioned back to AAA Toledo on July 17, 2016. After batting .324 in June with four home runs, he was 3-for-23 in July and had some defensive lapses in right field. Manager Brad Ausmus stated he wanted Moya to work on his outfield defense in a "less stressful environment". He was outrighted to Triple-A on March 31, 2017, and split the year between Triple-A Toledo and Double-A Erie, accumulating a .213/.272/.405 slash line with 18 home runs and 50 RBI. Moya elected free agency on November 6.

Chunichi Dragons

On December 1, 2017, Moya signed a one-year contract with the Chunichi Dragons of Nippon Professional Baseball (NPB).
On April 20, 2018, he made his NPB debut. He finished his first NPB season with a slash line of .301/.347/.441 with 3 home runs and 16 RBI. In 7 games for the team in 2019, Moya went 5-for-22 with 1 home run and 3 RBI.

Orix Buffaloes
On June 30, 2019, it was announced that Moya had been traded to the Orix Buffaloes for cash. In 64 games for the team, Moya batted .244/.278/.397 with 10 home runs and 35 RBI. On December 20, 2019, Moya signed a 1-year extension to remain with the Buffaloes. In 2020 for Orix, Moya slashed .274/.324/.567 with 12 home runs and 38 RBI in 46 games for the club.

In the 2021 season, Moya played in 106 games for the Buffaloes. In 354 at-bats, he slashed .229/.261/.373 with 13 home runs and 47 RBI. He became a free agent following the year.

Gastonia Honey Hunters
On March 7, 2023, Moya signed with the Gastonia Honey Hunters of the Atlantic League of Professional Baseball.

Awards and accomplishments
2014 Eastern League All-Star Game MVP
2014 Eastern League MVP
2014 Arizona Fall League Top Prospects Team

Personal life
Moya was born in Puerto Rico to Dominican parents, and when he was 2 months old, his family returned to the Dominican Republic.

References

External links

1991 births
Living people
Chunichi Dragons players
Detroit Tigers players
Dominican Republic expatriate baseball players in Japan
Dominican Summer League Tigers players
Erie SeaWolves players
Glendale Desert Dogs players
Gulf Coast Tigers players
Lakeland Flying Tigers players
Major League Baseball left fielders
Major League Baseball players from Puerto Rico
Major League Baseball right fielders
Nippon Professional Baseball first basemen
Nippon Professional Baseball outfielders
Orix Buffaloes players
People from Río Piedras, Puerto Rico
Puerto Rican people of Dominican Republic descent
Toledo Mud Hens players
Toros del Este players
Puerto Rican expatriate baseball players in the Dominican Republic
West Michigan Whitecaps players